Henvey Inlet First Nation is an Ojibwe First Nations band government in Parry Sound District, Ontario, Canada. It has two reserves; French River 13 and Henvey Inlet 2.

First Nations in Ontario
Ojibwe governments